Jiracek may refer to:

 Jiráček, Czech surname
 Mount Jiracek, Southern Cross Mountains, Victoria Land, Antarctica
 George R. Jiracek, American geologist

See also
 Jiráček, surname
 Jireček (disambiguation), surname and disambiguation page